Aid to the Church in Need is an international Catholic pastoral aid organization, which yearly offers financial support to more than 5,000 projects worldwide.

Aid to the Church in Need's General Secretariat and Project Headquarters is in Königstein, Germany. With 23 national offices, Aid to the Church in Need provides aid to Catholic communities in around 140 countries around the world. In 2021 the foundation funded 5298 projects in 132 countries.

History
The roots of Aid to the Church in Need (ACN) go back to the time after World War II. For the Dutch priest Werenfried van Straaten the Stunde Null was the starting point of his life's work. In 1947 he founded Aid to the Eastern Priests, centred in Belgium, aimed mostly at providing material and pastoral support to displaced Germans, including Catholic priests from East Germany.  Although the initial goal was to aid refugees who fled or were expelled from Eastern Europe in the wake of the Second World War, many of them Catholic, in 1952 the organisation began to work to help persecuted Christians behind the Iron Curtain. In 1961 work spread to Christians in difficulty in Asia, and in 1965 to Africa.

In 1984 ACN was recognised as a Universal Public Association of Pontifical Right, and later, during his pontificate, in December 2011, Pope Benedict XVI recognised the importance of Aid to the Church in Need's work by elevating the charity to a Pontifical Foundation of the Catholic Church. At the same time, the Pope appointed the Prefect of the Congregation for the Clergy, Cardinal Mauro Piacenza, to the position of President of the Foundation.

By a personal decision of Pope John Paul II, in 1992, following the end of communism across most of Eastern Europe, ACN begins to work towards dialogue with the Russian Orthodox Church, and in 2007 Benedict XVI asks the organisation to intensify its work in the Middle East, as Christians face rising persecution there. 

In 2019 Aid to the Church in Need becomes involved in the Safeguarding project, helping local churches to introduce measures to prevent abuse, and encouraging safeguarding courses for priests and religious worldwide.

Sexual Assault Allegation
In 2021 Die Zeit published an article which made known the existence of a letter from 2010 indicating that Werenfried van Straaten was accused of committing sexual assault in 1973 against a 20-year-old woman working for the charity. In a statement consisting of questions and answers, the charity responded to the disclosure and noted that "ACN deeply regrets the serious allegations and condemns any kind of behavior of which Father van Straaten has been accused in the article."

References

External links
Official website

Christian organizations established in 1947
Catholic charities
Charities based in Germany
Religious service organizations
Non-profit organisations based in Hesse